Jeanne Thornton (born 1983) is an American writer and copublisher of Instar Books and Rocksalt Magazine. She has received the Judith A. Markowitz Award for Emerging LGBTQ Writers. Anthologies to which she has contributed to have won a Lambda Literary Award and a Barbara Gittings Literature Award. Works she has written and edited have been finalists for Lambda Literary Awards for Debut Fiction, Transgender Fiction, and Graphic Novel. Her 2021 novel Summer Fun is a one-sided epistolary novel consisting of letters from a transgender woman in New Mexico to a fictional musician based on Brian Wilson of the Beach Boys; it won the 2022 Lambda Literary Award for Transgender Fiction.

Biography
Thornton is a transgender woman. She lived in Austin, Texas from 2011 to 2014.

Awards

Bibliography

Writer 

 Summer Fun (2021)
 The Black Emerald (2014)
 The Dream of Doctor Bantam (2012)

Editor 

 We're Still Here: An All-Trans Comics Anthology (2018)

Contributor 

 Meanwhile, Elsewhere: Science Fiction and Fantasy from Transgender Writers (2017)
 Transcendent 2: The Year's Best Transgender Speculative Fiction 2016 (2017)
 Procyon Science Fiction Anthology 2016 (2016)
 Where We're Going We Don't Need Roads (2014)
 Tales of Two Cities: The Best and Worst of Times In Today's New York (2014)

References

External links 

 Instar Books
 Official website

1983 births
American women novelists
Living people
21st-century American novelists
Writers from Texas
People from Austin, Texas
21st-century American women writers
Writers from Michigan
People from Muskegon, Michigan
American transgender writers